The molecular formula C8H15NO3 (molar mass: 173.21 g/mol, exact mass: 173.1052 u) may refer to:

 Acetylleucine
 Swainsonine
 SCH-50911

Molecular formulas